Sidharth "Sid" Sriram (born 19 May 1990) is an American Carnatic musician, music producer, playback singer, and songwriter of Indian Tamil origin. He is an R&B songwriter and has been working in the Tamil ,Telugu, Kannada, Malayalam, Hindi, Marathi and English music industry. He regularly collaborates with his sister Pallavi Sriram, a Bharatanatyam dancer, and music directors.

Early life

Sid Sriram was born in Chennai, Tamil Nadu, to a Tamil family. He moved with his parents to California at the age of one, growing up in Fremont. His musical skills were nurtured by his mother, Latha Sriram, a Carnatic music teacher in the San Francisco Bay Area. He started learning Carnatic music since he was 3 years old.

He simultaneously started picking up R&B. After graduating from Mission San Jose High School in 2008, he joined the Berklee College of Music and graduated in music production and engineering. Since his graduation, he has been regularly visiting India and performing Carnatic concerts, including as a part of the December Music season - Marghazhi Utsavam. Since then, he moved back to India and currently resides in the Mylapore area in Chennai.

Career
He also recently worked in some Malayalam songs like Uyire from Gauthamante Radham and also worked in some Telugu songs like Kola Kale Ila from Varudu Kavalenu. He also sang two songs from the Hindi film Jhund.

He also made his debut as a music composer where he would compose for ace director Mani Ratnam's production, Vaanam Kottatum, which is directed by Mani's former assistant and director of Padaiveeran, Dhana Sekharan. His Srivalli song from Pushpa: The Rise was well received

Discography

Composer

Playback singing/Vocalist

Tamil

Telugu

Malayalam

Kannada

Hindi

Marathi

Awards and nominations

Film Awards

References

External links

Sid Sriram Family

1990 births
Living people
American male singers of Indian descent
American male musicians of Indian descent
Contemporary R&B singers
People from Fremont, California
Singers from California
21st-century American singers
Male Carnatic singers
Carnatic singers
American male singer-songwriters
American playback singers
Tamil playback singers
Telugu playback singers
American people of Indian Tamil descent
Berklee College of Music alumni
Filmfare Awards South winners
Singers from Chennai
Indian emigrants to the United States
Expatriate musicians in India
American expatriates in India
21st-century American male singers